Saint-Père-Marc-en-Poulet (before 2018: Saint-Père) is a commune in the Ille-et-Vilaine department in Brittany in northwestern France.

Population
Inhabitants of Saint-Père are called péréens in French.

See also
Communes of the Ille-et-Vilaine department

References

External links

Official website 

Mayors of Ille-et-Vilaine Association 

Communes of Ille-et-Vilaine